Paul Tait may refer to:

Paul Tait (footballer, born 1971), English football midfielder, formerly at Birmingham City
Paul Tait (footballer, born 1974), English football striker for Northwich Victoria, Bristol Rovers and others

See also
Paul Tate (disambiguation)